Dactylastele poupineli is a species of sea snail, a marine gastropod mollusk in the family Calliostomatidae.

Description

Distribution

References

 Marshall, B.A., 1995. Calliostomatidae (Mollusca: Gastropoda: Trochoidea) from New Caledonia, the Loyalty Islands, and the northern Lord Howe Rise. Résultats des Campagnes Musorstom 14 (Bouchet, P., ed.). Mémoires de la Muséum National d’Histoire Naturelle 167: 381–458
 Herbert D.G. (1996) A critical review of the trochoidean types in the Muséum d'Histoire naturelle, Bordeaux (Mollusca, Gastropoda). Bulletin du Muséum national d'Histoire naturelle, Paris, ser. 4, 18 (A, 3–4): 409–445

External links

poupineli
Gastropods described in 1875